Parc Levelt is a football stadium in Saint-Marc, Haiti. It was launched in December 1950. The stadium holds 5,000 spectators.

External links
Stadium information 

Football venues in Haiti